Clara Taggart MacChesney (sometimes McChesney) (1860/61-1928) was an American painter and writer known for her figurative painting, landscapes and “scenes and people of Holland.”

Early years
Born in Brownsville, California, her family moved to Oakland when she was young where her father, Joseph B. McChesney, was principal of Oakland High School.

MacChesney began her art studies in San Francisco with Virgil Williams at the California School of Design, before moving to New York City to continue her studies with H. S. Mowbray and J. C. Beckwith.  This was followed by a move to Paris, where she enrolled in the Académie Colarossi and studied with Courtois.

MacChesney exhibited watercolors at the 1893 World's Columbian Exposition in Chicago, and was awarded a medal for her work. An article in The San Francisco Call announced that she had placed two paintings in the 1900 World's Exposition in Paris, and remarked that: "Both American and foreign artists have referred to Miss McChesney as 'America's foremost woman painter.' " She would later exhibit at the 1904 St. Louis World's Fair, winning a bronze medal.

She also wrote and published pieces for New York art publications, “frequently on her lifelong friend Elizabeth Nourse.”

MacChesney lived in Carmel-by-the-Sea, California in the 1920s. She wrote about Carmel-by-the-Sea and its pageant and drama in the New-York Tribune.

Death
She died in London on August 6, 1928.

Gallery

Works
 A Good Story (Portrait of Robert Loftin Newman), (1900) Smithsonian American Art Museum, Washington, D.C.
 Still Life with Plate and Kettle, National Arts Club, Manhattan, New York City
Hay Barges, San Francisco, Oakland Museum, Oakland, California
 Portrait of Governor George C. Pardee (1911), California State Capitol, Sacramento

References

External links
 

1860s births
1928 deaths
19th-century American painters
20th-century American painters
American women painters
19th-century American women artists
20th-century American women artists
Académie Colarossi alumni
Artists from Oakland, California
Painters from California
San Francisco Art Institute alumni